Ligurian may refer to:
 Ligurian, pertaining to modern Liguria in Italy
 Ligurian, pertaining to the ancient Ligures
 Ligurian language, a modern Romance language spoken in parts of Italy, France, Monaco and Argentina
 Ligurian (ancient language), an extinct language spoken by the ancient Ligures
 Ligurian Sea, an arm of the Mediterranean Sea
 Ligurian bee, a type of Italian bee (Apis mellifera ligustica)

Language and nationality disambiguation pages